{{DISPLAYTITLE:C20H23NO4}}
The molecular formula C20H23NO4 may refer to:

 Efaproxiral, an allosteric effector of hemoglobin
 Isopavine, an alkaloid
 6-Monoacetylcodeine, a codein ester
 Naltrexone, a medication primarily used to manage alcohol dependence
 Osemozotan, an experimental drug candidate
 Pavine, an alkaloid found in poppy species
 Thebacon, a semisynthetic opioid used as an analgesic